Harika Dronavalli (born 12 January 1991) is an Indian chess player who holds the FIDE title of Grandmaster (GM). She has won three bronze medals in the Women's World Chess Championship, in 2012, 2015 and 2017. Dronavalli was honored with the Arjuna Award for the year 2007–08 by the government of India. In 2016, she won the FIDE Women's Grand Prix event at Chengdu, China and rose up from world no. 11 to world no. 5 in FIDE women's ranking. Vladimir Kramnik, Judit Polgar and Viswanathan Anand are her chess inspirations. In 2019, she was awarded the Padma Shri for her contributions towards the field of sports.

Early life 
Harika was born to Ramesh and Swarna Dronavalli on 12 January 1991 in Guntur where she attended Sri Venkateswara Bala Kuteer school Her father works as a deputy executive engineer at a Panchayat Raj subdivision in Mangalagiri. She started playing chess at a very young age and won a medal in the under-9 national championship. She followed it up with a silver medal in the world youth chess championship for under-10 girls. She subsequently became a student of coach NVS Ramaraju who refined her game. She became the second Indian woman to become a grandmaster, after Humpy Koneru.

Personal life 
She married Hyderabad-based Karteek Chandra in August 2018. Her sister, Anusha, is married to Telugu film director K. S. Ravindra.

Achievements

2021 
 Won Silver Medal at 2021 FIDE Women's World Team Championship.
 Won Bronze Medal at FIDE Online Chess Olympiad 2021.

2019 
 Awarded Padma Sri on 26 January (Republic Day).

2017 
 Bronze Medal at the Women's World Chess Championship, 10 February – 4 March, Tehran, Iran.

2016 
 FIDE Women Grand Prix, Khanty Mansiysk - 5th position
 FIDE Women Grand Prix, Chengdu - Gold Medal.
 Asian Women Team Chess Championship, UAE - Member Indian Team
 Individual Gold medal in Rapid format.
 Individual Silver Medal on Top Board in Classical format.
 Team won Bronze Medal in Rapid format.

2015 
 World Women's Online Blitz Championship, Rome - Gold Medal.
 Asian Rapid Women Chess Championship, UAE - Bronze Medal.
 World Women Team Chess Championship, China - Member Indian Team
 Individual Silver Medal in Second Board 
 Team stood 4th place.
 World Women's Chess Championship, Sochi - Bronze Medal.
 FIDE Women Grand Prix, Sharjah - Bronze Medal.

2014 
 Asian Women Team Chess Championship, Iran - Member Indian Team
 Team won Silver medal in Standard format 
 Individual Gold Medal on Top Board
 Team won Silver medal in Rapid format

2012 
 World Women's Chess Championship, Khanty-Mansysk - Bronze Medal.
 Asian Women Team Chess Championship, China - Member Indian Team
 Team won Bronze Medal
 Women Chess Olympiad, Turkey - Member Indian Team
 Team got 4th place (best result in Indian Women Chess History.)
 World Women Team Chess Championship, Turkey, - Member Indian Team 
 Individual Silver Medal in Second Board 
 Team stood 4th place.

2011 
 2011 Women Grandmaster Chess Tournament, Hangzhou, China - scored 5.5/9 and secured her third GM norm (The GM title was conferred by the FIDE Congress 2011 82nd in Kraków, Poland in October.)
 Asian Women Chess Championship, Iran - Gold Medal.
 Commonwealth Women Chess Championship, South Africa - Silver Medal.
 Grandmaster (GM) Title - Second Woman to Become Grandmaster in India.

2010 
 Commonwealth Women Chess Championship, New Delhi - Gold Medal.
 16th Asian Games, Women's Individual Chess Category, Guangzhou China - Bronze Medal.

2009 
 Asian Women Team Chess Championship, Kolkata - Captain Indian Women's Team
 Team won Silver Medal 
 Individual Gold Medal on Top Board.
 III Asian Indoor Games, Vietnam 
 Women Individual Rapid Chess - Bronze Medal.
 Member in Team Blitz Chess - Bronze Medal.
 Team Rapid Chess - Bronze Medal.

2008 
 World Junior Girls Chess Championship, Turkeym - Gold Medal.
 Asian Women Team Chess Championship, Visakhapatnam - Captain Indian Team
 Team won Silver Medal 
 Individual Silver Medal on Top Board.

2007 
 Men International Master
 2nd Asian Indoor Games, Macau
 Rapid Chess Individual Women - Gold Medal.
 Classical Chess Individual Women - Bronze Medal.
 2nd Asian Indoor Games, Macau - Member Team India
 Rapid Chess Team - Gold Medal.
 Classical Chess Team - Silver Medal.
 Blitz Chess Team - Silver Medal.
 Asian Zonal Women Chess Championship, Bangladesh - Gold Medal.
 Commonwealth Women Chess Championship, New Delhi - Gold Medal.

2006 
 World Youth Championship U-18 Girls, Georgia - Gold Medal.
 Commonwealth Women Chess Championship, Mumbai - Gold Medal.

2005 
 Asian Junior Girls Championship, Bikaner - Silver Medal.

2004 
 Woman Grandmaster (WGM) Title - Youngest Woman Grandmaster in Asian Continent.
 Commonwealth U-18 Girls Chess Championship, Mumbai - Gold Medal.
 Asian U-18 Girls Chess Championship, Iran - Bronze Medal.
 World Youth Championship U-14 Girls, Greece - Gold Medal.

2003 
 Commonwealth Women Chess Championship, Mumbai - Silver Medal.
 Asian Women Chess Championship, Calicut - Silver Medal.
 Woman International Master (WIM) Title - Youngest Woman International Master in Asian Continent.
 Asian Women Team Chess Championship, Jodhpur -Member Indian Team
 Team won Bronze Medal. 
 Individual Gold Medal on 4th Board.

2002 
 Asian U-18 Girls Chess Championship, Bikaner - Gold Medal.
 Asian Under-12 Girls Chess Championship, Iran - Gold Medal.
 World Youth Chess Championship U-12 Girls, Greece - Bronze Medal.

2001 
 World Youth Chess Championship U-12 Girls, Spain - Silver Medal
 Asian Under-12 Girls Chess Championship, Bikaner - Silver Medal

2000 
 World Youth Chess Championship U-10 Girls, Spain - Silver Medal

National Level Achievements 
 2009 - National Women Chess Championship, Chennai - Gold Medal.
 Won 16 Medals in National Level Tournaments including Women 'A' Championship, Women 'B' Championship, National Junior Girls and Sub-Junior Girls Titles during these 16 years.

Other Achievements 
 Chess Player of the Year - 2016 and 2017 by The Times of India (TOISA Annual Awards)
 Featured by Verve magazine in 2017 amongst the top 40 popular women sportspersons of the year

References

External links

 
 Harika Dronavalli  at Chess Database

1991 births
Living people
Indian female chess players
Chess grandmasters
Female chess grandmasters
World Youth Chess Champions
World Junior Chess Champions
Chess Olympiad competitors
Asian Games medalists in chess
Asian Games bronze medalists for India
Chess players at the 2010 Asian Games
Medalists at the 2010 Asian Games
People from Guntur district
Recipients of the Arjuna Award
Recipients of the Padma Shri in sports
Sportswomen from Andhra Pradesh
Sport in Guntur
Telugu people
21st-century Indian women
21st-century Indian people